Dimefline is a respiratory stimulant.

References 

Respiratory agents
Resorcinol ethers
Flavones